Indian Pharmacopoeia Commission (IPC) is an autonomous institution of the Ministry of Health and Family Welfare which sets standards for all drugs that are manufactured, sold and consumed in India.  The set of standards are published under the title Indian Pharmacopoeia (IP) which has been modelled on and historically follows from the British Pharmacopoeia. The standards that are in effect since 1 December 2010, are the Indian Pharmacopoeia 2010 (IP 2010). The Pharmacopoeia 2014 was released by Health Minister Ghulam Nabi Azad on 4 November 2013. The Pharmacopoeia 2018 was released by Secretary, Ministry of Health & Family Welfare, Government of India. 

I.P., the abbreviation of 'Indian Pharmacopoeia' is familiar to the consumers in the Indian sub-continent as a mandatory drug name suffix. Drugs manufactured in India have to be labelled with the mandatory non-proprietary drug name with the suffix I.P. This is similar to the B.P. suffix for British Pharmacopoeia and the U.S.P. suffix for the United States Pharmacopeia.

The IPC was formed according to the Indian Drugs and Cosmetics Act of 1940 and established by executive orders of the Government of India in 1956.

Pharmacopoeia – History of publication
The actual process of publishing the first Pharmacopoeia started in the year 1944 under the chairmanship of Col. R. N. Chopra. The I. P. list was first published in the year 1946 and was put forth for approval. The titles are suffixed with the respective years of publication, e.g. IP 1996. The following table describes the publication history of the Indian Pharmacopoeia. 

9th edition 2022

See also 
 Pharmacopoeia
Landscape

References

Pharmacopoeias
Pharmacy organisations in India
Indian commissions and inquiries
1956 establishments in Uttar Pradesh
Government agencies established in 1956